The 1930 Cork Senior Hurling Championship was the 42nd staging of the Cork Senior Hurling Championship since its establishment by the Cork County Board in 1887. The draw for the opening round fixtures took place at the Cork Convention on 26 January 1930. The championship began on 13 April 1930 and ended on 14 September 1930.

Blackrock were the defending champions.

On 14 September 1930, Blackrock won the championship following a 3-8 to 1-3 defeat of Glen Rovers in the final. This was their 20th championship title overall and their second successive title.

Team changes

To Championship

Promoted from the Cork Intermediate Hurling Championship
 Ballincollig

From Championship

Regraded to the Cork Intermediate Hurling Championship
 Collins

Results

First round

Second round

Semi-finals

Final

Championship statistics

Miscellaneous

 Glen Rovers qualified for the final for the first time in their history.

References

Cork Senior Hurling Championship
Cork Senior Hurling Championship